Zavang may refer to:
 Zavang-e Olya
 Zavang-e Sofla